Alberto Barenghi (2 May 1930 – 18 November 2002) was an Argentine boxer. He competed in the men's flyweight event at the 1952 Summer Olympics.

References

External links
 

1930 births
2002 deaths
Argentine male boxers
Olympic boxers of Argentina
Boxers at the 1952 Summer Olympics
Pan American Games gold medalists for Argentina
Pan American Games medalists in boxing
Boxers at the 1951 Pan American Games
Place of birth missing
Flyweight boxers
Medalists at the 1951 Pan American Games